This article lists the commanders-in-chief of the Chilean Navy. The Chilean Navy is the naval force of Chile. The Chilean Navy dates back to 1817.

The current Commander-in-Chief is Admiral Juan Andrés de la Maza Larrain. He was appointed by former President Sebastian Piñera on 18 June 2021.

List

Valparaíso governor (1812–1818)

Navy General Commander (1818–1897)

Navy General Director (1897–1927)

Navy Inspector General (1927–1932)

Navy General Director (1932–1938)

Navy Commander-in-chief (1938–present)

See also
Chilean Navy
List of commanders-in-chief of the Chilean Army
List of commanders-in-chief of the Chilean Air Force

References

Chilean Navy officers
Chilean admirals
Chile